Marah (the manroots, wild cucumbers, or cucumber gourds) are flowering plants in the gourd family (Cucurbitaceae), native to western North America.

Except for the isolated range of Marah gilensis (Gila manroot) in west-central Arizona and island populations (M. macrocarpus var. major), all manroot species inhabit overlapping ranges distributed from Southern Canada to Northern Mexico. Although Marah oreganus (coastal manroot) extends inland into Idaho, all other manroot species except M. gilensis are confined to areas within 300 km of the Pacific Ocean coast.

Description
The manroots are perennial plants, growing from a large tuberous root. Most have stout, scabrous or hairy stems, with coiling tendrils that enable them to climb up other plants; they can also grow rapidly across level ground. Their leaves tend to have multiple lobes, up to 7 in some species. The fruits are striking and easily recognized. They are large, and spherical, oval or cylindrical. Both leaf and fruit shape vary widely between individual plants and leaves can be particularly variable even on the same vine.

The anthropomorphic common names "manroot" and "old man in the ground" derive from the swollen lobes and arm-like extensions of the unearthed tuber.

Taxonomy and systematics

Marah species hybridize freely where ranges overlap and this, in addition to intra-species leaf and fruit variability, makes definite identification of specimens a particular challenge.

A proper genetic analysis of Marah phylogeny has not yet been undertaken. The standard taxonomy has been based on morphological comparisons and geographic considerations.

Some authors include the manroots in genus Echinocystis. Considered as a separate genus, however, it includes six or seven species, some of them with well-defined varieties within them:

Marah fabacea – California manroot
Marah fabacea var. agrestis
Marah fabacea var. fabacea
Marah gilensis – Gila manroot
Marah guadalupensis – often included in M. macrocarpus var. major
Marah horridus – Sierra manroot
Marah macrocarpa – Cucamonga manroot
Marah macrocarpa var. macrocarpa
Marah macrocarpa var. major
Marah macrocarpa var. micrantha
Marah oreganus – coastal manroot
Marah watsonii – Taw manroot

Use by humans

Marah oreganus are used medicinally by Native Americans. The Chinook make a poultice from the gourd. The Squaxin mash the upper stalk in water to dip aching hands. The Chehalis burn the root and mixed the resulting powder with bear grease to apply to scrofula sores. The Coast Salish make a decoction to treat venereal disease, kidney trouble and scrofula sores.

The dried spiky fruit can be soaked in water so that the spikes can be easily removed. They are difficult to remove otherwise. The hard fruit becomes soft in water and once the spikes are gone, the fruit makes a very efficient loofa. The tubers of M. fabaceus and M. macrocarpus contain saponins which can act as a natural soap.

Tubers of M. fabaceus are crushed and thrown into bodies of water by the Kumeyaay to immobilize fish. The tubers contain megharrhin, a saponin-like glucoside. Saponins lower the surface tension of water allowing the formation of bubbles.  It is likely that the substance enters the fish's circulation through the gill arches where only a single-cell epithelium separates the water from the animal's red blood cells. The affected fish float to the surface.

Like many medicinal plants, at least some Marah species are toxic if ingested and deaths have been reported from ingesting them.

Seeds of Marah fabaceus have been reported as being hallucinogenic.

References

 Gunther, Erna (1973): Ethnobotany of Western Washington (Revised ed.). University of Washington Press.
 Pojar, Jim & McKinnon, Andy (1994): Plants of the Pacific Northwest Coast. Lone Pine Publishing.

External links

Jepson manual treatment of genus Marah
Website About 5 California-native Marah Species

Cucurbitaceae genera
Cucurbitoideae
Flora of California
Plants used in traditional Native American medicine